The GF World Cup '08 was held in Århus, Denmark, from October 14 to October 19. It is an invitational women's handball tournament organized by the Danish Handball Association.

Competition

Group A 

All times are Central European Summer Time (UTC+2)

Group B 

All times are Central European Summer Time (UTC+2)

Knockout Rounds

Semifinals

Bronze Match

Final

All-Star Team 
Goalkeeper: Katrine Lunde Haraldsen 
Left Wing: Henriette Rønde Mikkelsen 
Left Back: Tonje Larsen 
Center Back: Kristine Lunde 
Right Back: Grit Jurack 
Right Wing: Josephine Touray 
Line Player: Marit Malm Frafjord 
MVP: Tonje Larsen

References 
Danish Handball Association Official Website

2008 in handball
2008 in Danish sport
GF World Cup
International handball competitions hosted by Denmark